Marcello Pavarin (born 22 October 1986) is a professional Italian road cyclist, who last rode for .

Palmarès

2006
 4th Gran Premio della Liberazione
2007
 10th Giro del Canavese
2008
 3rd Gran Premio della Liberazione
 7th Giro del Cigno
2009
 7th Coppa Sabatini
2010
 8th Gran Premio Nobili Rubinetterie – Coppa Città di Stresa
2011
 5th Hel van het Mergelland

References

External links

Marcello Pavarin profile at Vacansoleil-DCM

1986 births
Living people
Italian male cyclists
People from Rovigo
Cyclists from the Province of Rovigo